Claude Campos is a Brazilian retired footballer who played in the NASL between 1970 and 1974 for the Rochester Lancers.

In 1971, Graham Leggat kicked Campos in the face in a game between the Lancers and the Toronto Metros.  The kick broke Campos' jaw in five places. In 1977, he was named to the Rochester Lancers Team of the Decade.

References

External links
 NASL career stats

Year of birth missing (living people)
Living people
Association football goalkeepers
Brazilian footballers
Brazilian expatriate footballers
Rochester Lancers (1967–1980) players
North American Soccer League (1968–1984) players
Expatriate soccer players in the United States
Brazilian expatriate sportspeople in the United States